Ramon de Araújo Siqueira (born 19 September 1998), commonly known as Ramon, is a Brazilian footballer who currently plays as a forward for FC Ryukyu.

Club career
In 2018, Ramon agreed a deal to sign with Spanish giants Real Madrid on a one-year loan deal, in which he would have played for their Castilla team. However, this deal fell through due to a knee injury found during his medical.

In 2019 , Ramon joined Japanese second division side FC Ryukyu for the remainder of the J2 League season in their bid the avoid relegation.
In 2020 Ramon joined FC Ryukyu on a permanent basis after his contract at Fluminense expired.

International career
Ramon represented Brazil at the 2015 South American Under-17 Football Championship.

Career statistics

Club

Notes

References

External links

1998 births
Living people
Brazilian footballers
Brazilian expatriate footballers
Brazil youth international footballers
Association football forwards
J2 League players
Fluminense FC players
FC Ryukyu players
Gainare Tottori players
Brazilian expatriate sportspeople in Japan
Expatriate footballers in Japan
Footballers from Rio de Janeiro (city)